Hagen is a former Samtgemeinde ("collective municipality") in the district of Cuxhaven, in Lower Saxony, Germany. Its seat was in Hagen im Bremischen. It was disbanded on 1 January 2014.

The Samtgemeinde Hagen consisted of the following municipalities:

 Bramstedt 
 Driftsethe 
 Hagen im Bremischen
 Sandstedt
 Uthlede 
 Wulsbüttel

References

Cuxhaven (district)
Former Samtgemeinden in Lower Saxony